Mike Bauer and David Rikl were the defending champions but did not compete that year.

Ellis Ferreira and Jan Siemerink won in the final 6–4, 7–5 against Todd Woodbridge and Mark Woodforde.

Seeds

  Todd Woodbridge /  Mark Woodforde (final)
  Alex O'Brien /  Sandon Stolle (first round)
  Mark Keil /  Jeff Tarango (quarterfinals)
  Hendrik Jan Davids /  Piet Norval (first round)

Draw

External links
1995 CA-TennisTrophy Doubles Draw

Doubles